John Helm may refer to:

John L. Helm (1802–1867), former Governor of Kentucky
John Helm (commentator) (born 1942), English sports commentator

See also
Jack Helms, American football player
Jack Helm, American Old West sheriff and Texas State Policeman